Tiburoneros is a 1963 Mexican film. It was directed by Luis Alcoriza.

External links
 

1963 films
Mexican drama films
1960s Spanish-language films
Films directed by Luis Alcoriza
1960s Mexican films